The 2006–07 BBL season, the 20th since its establishment of the British Basketball League, started on 29 September 2006 when reigning champions Newcastle Eagles began with an 85–83 loss away to Sheffield Sharks.

Ten teams took to the field this season, including two new franchises to the BBL, London United and the Worcester Wolves, who both moved up from the English Basketball League during summer 2006. The new additions were brought in after three teams withdrew from the League before the start of the season. Brighton Bears and London Towers both took the decision to "park" their respective franchises and take a one-year break whilst Birmingham Bullets also decided to sit out due to a lack of suitable home venues available and have since gone into liquidation.

Teams

Notable occurrences 

 Following on from Brighton and Birmingham's decision to withdraw from the league, London Towers announced they were to be the third, and most high-profile team to sit out the upcoming season.
 London United and Worcester Wolves were both elected from the English Basketball League to replace the three departed teams, and to keep franchises in the major markets of London and the Midlands.
 A£2.5 million sponsorship deal was agreed on 22 September 2006, between the BBL and national broadcaster MKTV, including primetime TV coverage of 40 live games per season, high-profile sponsorship and a National Community Development Programme.
 Molten, the world's leading manufacturer of inflatable sports balls, signed a ball sponsorship with the BBL worth £150,000 prior to the season opening. The new GG7 ball was unveiled on 25 September as the official match ball for the next three seasons.
 New league franchise Worcester Wolves record their first ever BBL win on 7 October, an 82–79 home victory against Chester Jets.
 The BBL Cup final took place at the National Indoor Arena, in Birmingham on 7 January 2007, and saw Guildford Heat claim their first Championship since foundation 18 months previous, with an 81–78 win against Scottish Rocks. The game was the first ever BBL match to be broadcast live over the internet, reaching a potentially worldwide audience.
 Plymouth Raiders also won their first silverware since stepping-up to the BBL, with a 74–65 win in the BBL Trophy final against holders Newcastle Eagles on 4 March. Held at Newcastle's Metro Radio Arena, the game was the first to be broadcast live on national television in over four years, as part of the sponsorship agreement with MKTV.
 Leicester Riders guard, and former Los Angeles Lakers star Steve Bucknall, as well as Guildford star Chad McKnight both test positive for marijuana and are each handed a three-month suspension. However, the story only comes to public attention several months later.
 Chester Jets owner and head coach Mike Burton announced prior to their season finale that he would be retiring from the franchise at the end of the season. Burton's announcement, after 19 years at the helm, put serious doubts of the clubs' future.
 Despite leading the League for most of the season, Guildford's one point 90–91 loss away to Scottish Rocks on 1 April, ensured that the title race went down to the wire, and only a final day 114–85 win at home to Chester Jets on 8 April guaranteed the 2007 League crown would belong to the Heat.
 Newcastle, playing in front of their home fans at the Metro Radio Arena on 29 April, were victorious against a resilient Scottish Rocks in the climax to the BBL Finals Weekend and the BBL season, as they claimed their third consecutive Playoff Championship with a 95–82 win.

BBL Championship (Tier 1)

Final standings

The play-offs

Quarter-finals

Semi-finals

Third-place game

Final

National League Division 1 (Tier 2)

Final standings

National League Division 2 (Tier 3)

Final standings

BBL Cup 
This season's edition of the BBL Cup saw the two lowest seeds from the previous season's League rankings face off with the BBL's two newest additions – London United and Worcester Wolves – in the first round. As expected, the experience of Milton Keynes and Plymouth paid off and both teams advanced to the quarter-finals to join the rest of their league rivals in the last eight. In the clash of the round, eventual winners Guildford Heat saw off the Plymouth Raiders in a tie dominated by the shooting of Chad McKnight, who posted 39 points for the Heat.

The Semi-finals saw the league's four strongest teams drawn against each other, but while Guildford easily dispatched the visiting Sheffield Sharks, the Cup holders Newcastle Eagles, were defeated by the Scottish Rocks, where Rocks' Robert Yanders netted a game-high 23 points.

In only their second season since establishment, Guildford's success story continued when they scooped their first piece of silverware with an 82–79 victory in the Cup Final against the Rocks. Heat's star guard Brian Dux was named as MVP scoring 21 points on the way to victory.

First round

Quarter-finals

Semi-finals

Final

BBL Trophy 
Due to the lack of teams competing in this season's Championship, the BBL Trophy featured all 10 BBL teams plus six invited teams, four from the English Basketball League (Coventry Crusaders, London Leopards, Reading Rockets and Worthing Thunder) and two from the Scottish Basketball League (Edinburgh Kings and Troon Tornadoes). The First round saw all 16 teams divided into four regionalised groups with the top finishing team advancing to the Semi-finals.

Group stage 

Northern Group 1

Southern Group 1

Northern Group 2

Southern Group 2

Semi-finals

Final

Statistics leaders

Monthly awards

Seasonal awards 

 Most Valuable Player: Brian Dux (Guildford Heat) and Jeff Bonds (Sheffield Sharks)
 Coach of the Year: Paul James (Guildford Heat)
 All-Star First Team:
 Jeff Bonds (Sheffield Sharks)
 Brian Dux (Guildford Heat)
 Mike Martin (Guildford Heat)
 Carlton Aaron (Plymouth Raiders)
 Robert Yanders (Scottish Rocks)
 All-Star Second Team:
 Blake Shelton (Sheffield Sharks)
 Jazwyn Cowan (Chester Jets)
 Sterling Davis (Scottish Rocks)
 Tarick Johnson (London United)
 Fabulous Flournoy (Newcastle Eagles)

References 

British Basketball League seasons
1
British